The 1986 Texas Tech Red Raiders football team represented Texas Tech University as a memnber of the Southwest Conference (SWC) during the 1986 NCAA Division I-A football season. In their first and only season under head coach David McWilliams, the Red Raiders compiled a 7–4 record in the regular season (5–3 against SWC opponents) and finished in a tie for fourth place in the conference. The team was invited to play in the 1986 Independence Bowl and lost to Ole Miss, 20 to 17. The team was coached in the bowl game by Spike Dykes.  Over the course of the full 1986 season, the team outscored opponents by a combined total of 271 to 268.  The team played its home games at Clifford B. and Audrey Jones Stadium in Lubbock, Texas.

Schedule

References

Texas Tech
Texas Tech Red Raiders football seasons
Texas Tech Red Raiders football